Bohago is a house in the parish of Creed in mid Cornwall, England, UK. The name comes from the Swedish word 'Bohag', meaning 'household goods'.

References

Houses in Cornwall